Dyrnæs was a Norse settlement in Eastern Settlement in Greenland. It was located to the north of modern-day Narsaq.

History
According to Ívar Bárðarson, Dyrnæs was one of the largest parishes in Norse Greenland. It consisted of a church and several farms, and probably covered the entire western part of the Narsaq peninsula. The ruins of the church were discovered during an archaeological dig in 1932.

References

Norse settlements in Greenland